Toa Payoh Single Member Constituency was a constituency that holds the Toa Payoh area, in the Central Region of Singapore, from 1959 to 1988. The constituency broke away into Boon Teck, Kim Keat and Kuo Chuan in 1972 general elections, and Khe Bong in 1976 general elections.

Member of Parliament

Candidates and results

Elections in 1950s

Elections in 1960s

Elections in 1970s

Elections in 1980s

References 

Singaporean electoral divisions
Toa Payoh